GLONASS-M, also known as Uragan-M (GRAU index 11F654M given to the first two pilot satellites and 14F113 to the rest) are the second generation of Uragan satellite design used as part of the Russian GLONASS radio-based satellite navigation system. Developed by ISS Reshetnev (Information Satellite Systems Reshetnev), it had its debut launch in 2003, and is in the process of being phased out. Its production finished in 2015 and its last launch was in November 2022. It is an evolution of the previous Uragan (GRAU Index 11F654) second-generation satellites, improving accuracy, increasing power, extending the design life and adding the FDMA L2OF open signal. The last eight Glonass-M spacecraft in production included the new CDMA L3OC open signal.

Design 
It used a 3-axis stabilized pressurized bus with two solar panels, a propulsion module and a payload module. At  these are just  heavier than the previous generation, but have 25% more power 1250 W, 230% more design life (7 years), an additional signal (L2OF) and generally improved accuracy. It uses an on-board computer based on a Russian microprocessor reimplementation of the VAX 11/750 architecture: the Angstrem K1839.

The Uragan-M are usually launched in trios, and due to the close distance, the radios of the three would interfere with each other, meaning that the ground segment can only command one satellite at a time. Setting sun pointing attitude for power and then Earth pointing attitude for communications for a single unit takes about 5 hours. Since the radio contact window with ground control is between 4 and 6 hours, ground control can not control all spacecraft in a single pass. The on-board computer in the Uragan-M can put the spacecraft in sun pointing mode autonomously, and does many of the start up processes so the ground segment can take control and process the Earth pointing mode.
  
The payload consists of  L-Band navigation signals in 25 channels separated by 0.5625 MHz intervals in 2 frequency bands: 1602.5625 - 1615.5 MHz and 1240 - 1260 MHz. EIRP 25 to 27 dBW. Right hand circular polarized. It transmits the FDMA signals L1OF, L1SF, L2OF and L2SF, with the open L2OF being new to the Uragan series. It uses 3 Cs clocks with a clock stability of 1x10−13 (an 5x improvement over the 5x10−13 clock stability of the previous generation Uragan).

In 2011 ISS Reshetnev announced plans to include the new CDMA signal L3OC, first introduced on Glonass-K series, on Glonass-M satellites flown from 2014; four of these enhanced models were launched between 2014 and 2019 (s/n 755 to 758); the remaining three were kept in reserve and launched as needed  until 2022 in case of on-orbit failures prior to planned replacement.

History 

The first generation Uragan spacecraft were created under ban of foreign radiation-hardened components and thus had been an inferior product with just 3 years of expected design life. Given the realized average life was just 22 months, and the fleet should have 24 spacecraft, it was necessary to launch more than 7 spacecraft per year to keep the fleet in good health. To this end, the Uragan-M was designed, with an increased design life of 7 years, thanks to the availability of ITAR controlled parts.

On December 1, 2001, a first generation GLONASS satellite Kosmos 2382 with new flight control and power systems was launched. This satellite was incorrectly named Uragan-M in a RIA Novosti news message issued days before the launch. When contacted by Novosti Kosmonavtiki magazine Roscosmos spokesman said all three launched satellites were first generation versions but one of them featured new upgraded flight control and power systems. Novosti Kosmonavtiki also pointed out the fact that GLONASS-M project had been approved on August 20, 2001, just three months before Kosmos 2382 launch. RIA Novosti mistake was widely propagated causing confusion regarding which satellite was the first GLONASS-M satellite.

On December 10, 2003, the first Uragan-M was launched by a Proton-K / Briz-M from Baikonur along two Uragan Block IIv satellites. On December 26, 2004, the second Uragan-M was launched by a Proton-K DM-2, also along two Uragan Block IIv satellites. And on December 25, 2005, two Uragan-M were launched along the last Uragan Block IIv satellites.

On December 25, 2006, launched the first trio of only Uragan-M. Two launches by late 2007 meant that six additional Uragan-M were added to the fleet. And another six were successfully launched in 2008. On September 12, 2008 Prime Minister Vladimir Putin signed RF Government Resolution on increasing GLONASS Program financing by 67 billion rubles. 2009 saw the launch of a single trio of Uragan-M, and with nine spacecraft planned for 2010, full service availability was expected. Regrettably, the third launch, on 5 December 2010, ended in failure, leaving no on-orbit spares.

On October 2, 2011, the first launch of single Uragan-M satellite was performed by a Soyuz-2.1b/Fregat-M which put Kosmos 2474 on orbit from the Plesetsk Cosmodrome. Another Proton-M launched trio and an additional Soyuz-2.1b/Fregat-M launch put the fleet at full operative capacity with 24 healthy satellites. On April 26, 2013, a Soyuz successfully orbited Kosmos 2485, but the Proton-M mission failed spectacularly taking with it a trio of Uragan-M. During 2014, two satellites were launched by Soyuz in March and June.

On a May 28, 2014 interview, Nikolay Testoyedov — president of ISS Reshetnev — stated that production of GLONASS-M would end in 2015, with GLONASS-K being exclusively produced after that final batch. In a December 14, 2014 interview with GPS World, he stated that while the original idea was to have just two GLONASS-K1 prototypes to be followed by the GLONASS-K2 production, the Western sanctions limited the supply of radiation resistant electronics. And thus, they had decided to launch an additional nine GLONASS-K1 as fleet replacement while they finished the GLONASS-K2 design. In a May, 2015 presentation, Mr. Testoyedov expected the last GLONASS-M to fly in late 2017. On July 30, 2015, ISS Reshetnev announced that it had completed the last GLONASS-M (No.61) spacecraft and it was putting it in storage waiting for launch, along with an additional eight already built satellites. The last production batch (s/n 755+) is an enhanced GLONASS-M that includes an additional transmitter and antenna for the L3OC CDMA signal. After four successful launches until 2019, the last three spacecraft remained in storage and were launched as needed in 2019-2022.

Uragan-M launches

Statistics

Launch history

Satellites

References 

GLONASS satellites